Tiruvasi Mattruraivaradeswarar Temple is a Tamil temple located at Tiruvasi in Trichy district of Tamil Nadu, India. The historical name of the place is Tirupalasiramam. The presiding deity is Shiva. He is called as Mattruraivaradar. His consort is known as Balambikai.

Significance 
It is one of the shrines of the 275 Paadal Petra Sthalams - Shiva Sthalams glorified in the early medieval Tevaram poems by Tamil Saivite Nayanars Tirugnanasambandar and Sundarar.

Literary mention 
Tirugnanasambandar describes the feature of the deity as:

References

External links 
 
 

Shiva temples in Tiruchirappalli district
Padal Petra Stalam